James William Bryan (June 9, 1853 – 1903) was the 24th Lieutenant Governor of Kentucky.

He was born in Bourbon County, Kentucky in 1853. In 1887, he ran for, and was elected Lieutenant Governor of Kentucky, serving a full four-year term under Governor Simon B. Buckner.

Sources
The Political Graveyard: Index to Politicians: Bryan at politicalgraveyard.com

Lieutenant Governors of Kentucky
1853 births
1903 deaths
People from Bourbon County, Kentucky